Chow Nasty is a blues-rock trio based in San Francisco.  The group, composed of singer/guitarist Damon Harris, bassist Joey Enos, and multi-instrumentalist Zac Hewitt, formed in Chicago in 2003.

Harris, Enos, and Hewitt, all native Californians, moved back to their home state at the start of 2004.  In October 2005, Alexis Rivera, of the management/event production company Echo Park Records,  became their manager.  Laursen directed their first electronic press kit, or EPK, in March 2006.

With their strong Bay Area following and a burgeoning LA fanbase, the band spent much of 2005 touring up and down the West Coast.  In October, 2005, the band shot a video for their song "Ungawa," by the directing team of Ally and Helder. 

In January 2006 the video for "Ungawa" had release dance parties at Mighty in San Francisco (sponsored by humor weekly The Onion) and at Little Pedro's in Los Angeles (sponsored by online hip-hop site Fusicology), each night featuring a performance by Chow Nasty as well as a line-up of local DJs. "Ungawa" proved to be a popular song online, where the track appeared on numerous audioblogs including [Fluxblog] and [Gorilla Vs. Bear], and in the LA club scene, where it was spun by Peaches and JD Samson of Le Tigre. The press response to Chow Nasty quickly blossomed, and the SF Weekly described the group as "Sweet jams and beats that go boom, it's 21st century soul music as played by three kids with A.D.D. and a cursory knowledge of Radio Shack electronics," and the SF Bay Guardian commenting that their "Infectiously goofy, balls-out shows come off like some kind of underage, oversexed punk b-boy Rolling Stones revival."

In March 2006 the group recorded their debut album at Prairie Sun Studios.  Featured on the album is the track "I Was Wrong," a duet between Harris and Lisa Kekaula, singer of the Bellrays and Grammy-winning vocalist with Basement Jaxx. The same month Chow Nasty was selected to headline the annual happy hour show as part of the week-long San Francisco music festival Noise Pop Festival.

The group has an unexplained link to a mysterious underground song called 'Dissatisfied Herbal Tea'.

External links
Chow Nasty
Chow Nasty on MySpace

Chow nasty
Musical groups established in 2003